The Roman Catholic Diocese of Concepción en Paraguay  is a diocese located in the city of Concepción in the Ecclesiastical province of Asunción in Paraguay.

History
 On May 1, 1929, the Diocese of Concepción y Chaco was established from the Roman Catholic Diocese of Paraguay and Apostolic Prefecture of Pilcomayo
 On July 7, 1949, the diocese was renamed as the Diocese of Concepción

Bishops
Roman rite
 Bishops of Concepción en Paraguay
 Bishop Emilio Sosa Gaona, S.D.B. (April 30, 1931 – May 14, 1963)
 Bishop Aníbal Maricevich Fleitas (December 4, 1965 – April 30, 1993)
 Bishop Juan Bautista Gavilán Velásquez (March 5, 1994 – December 18, 2001), appointed Bishop of Coronel Oviedo
 Bishop Zacarías Ortiz Rolón, S.D.B. (July 12, 2003 – July 11, 2013)
 Bishop Miguel Ángel Cabello Almada (July 11, 2013 – present)

Auxiliary Bishop
Julio Benigno Laschi González (1955-1965), appointed auxiliary bishop of Asunción

References
 GCatholic.org
 Catholic Hierarchy

Roman Catholic dioceses in Paraguay
Christian organizations established in 1929
Roman Catholic dioceses and prelatures established in the 20th century
Concepcion en Paraguay, Roman Catholic Diocese of
Concepción Department, Paraguay